Helen Mercedes Sauls-August is a South African politician and the current Speaker of the Eastern Cape Provincial Legislature. She was elected to the post in May 2019. She previously served as the provincial MEC for Human Settlement and the MEC for Health. She is a party member of the African National Congress. Sauls-August was also a councillor of the Nelson Mandela Metropolitan Municipality.

References

External links
Helen Mercedes Sauls-August – People's Assembly

Living people
Year of birth missing (living people)
Members of the Eastern Cape Provincial Legislature
People from the Eastern Cape
African National Congress politicians
Women members of provincial legislatures of South Africa
Women legislative speakers
South African politicians
Politicians from the Eastern Cape
Coloured South African people
21st-century South African politicians
21st-century South African women politicians